The ninth series of the British television drama series Waterloo Road began airing on 5 September 2013 on BBC One and ended on 12 March 2014. The series follows the lives of the staff and pupils of the eponymous school, a troubled Scottish comprehensive school. It consists of twenty episodes. This series also marks the departure of Grantly Budgen (Philip Martin Brown), the last of the original cast members.

Plot
The show follows the lives of the teachers and the pupils at the eponymous school of Waterloo Road, a failing inner-city comprehensive, tackling a wide range of issues often seen as taboo such as drug dealing, sexting, catfishing, stuttering, prescription drug abuse, stroke, identity fraud, stalking, human trafficking, deportation, drink driving and empty nest syndrome.

Cast and characters

Staff
 Laurie Brett as Christine Mulgrew;  Headteacher (19 episodes)
 Richard Mylan as Simon Lowsley; Deputy Headteacher and English teacher (20 episodes)
 Angus Deayton as George Windsor; Deputy Headteacher and Head of Modern Foreign Languages (20 episodes)
 Heather Peace as Nikki Boston; Head of Pupil Referral Unit and English teacher (20 episodes)
 Melanie Hill as Maggie Budgen; Home Economics teacher and Housemistress (20 episodes)
 Georgie Glen as Audrey McFall; Head of History (20 episodes)
 Vanessa Hehir as Sue Lowsley; Science teacher (20 episodes)
 Victoria Bush as Sonya Donnegan; School secretary (20 episodes)
 Zöe Lucker as Carol Barry; Canteen assistant and mother of the Barry children (12 episodes)
 Leon Ockenden as Hector Reid; Head of Physical Education (10 episodes)
 Philip Martin Brown as Grantly Budgen; English teacher and Housemaster (4 episodes)
 Elizabeth Tan as Princess Windsor; Mandarin Teaching Assistant and George's wife (3 episodes)

Pupils
 Mark Beswick as Darren Hughes (20 episodes)
 Rebecca Craven as Rhiannon Salt (20 episodes)
 Abby Mavers as Dynasty Barry (20 episodes)
 Kirstie Steele as Imogen Stewart (20 episodes)
 Kane Tomlinson-Weaver as Harley Taylor (20 episodes)
 Caitlin Gillespie as Lisa Brown (19 episodes)
 Je'Taime Morgan Hanley as Shaznay Montrose (19 episodes)
 Tommy Lawrence Knight as Kevin Chalk (19 episodes)
 Joe Slater as Lenny Brown (19 episodes)
 Marlene Madenge as Lula Tsibi (17 episodes)
 Carl Au as Barry Barry (16 episodes)
 Shane O'Meara as Connor Mulgrew (15 episodes)
 Christopher Chung as Archie Wong (12 episodes)
 Brogan Ellis as Kacey Barry (12 episodes)
 Naomi Battrick as Gabriella Wark (10 episodes)

Others

Recurring
 Kristin Atherton as Vix Spark; Sue's sister and Nikki's fiancée (10 episodes)
 Shaun Prendergast as Robert Bain; Director of the Department for Education and Sue and Vix's father (4 episodes)
 Sophie Skelton as Eve Boston; Nikki's estranged daughter (2 episodes)
 Connie Hyde as Amelia Wark; Gabriella's mother (2 episodes)
 Sarah Niles as Cecile Tsibi; Lula's mother (2 episodes)

Guest
 Tomasz Aleksander as Josef Kowalski; Shopkeeper (1 episode)
 Mark Benton as Daniel "Chalky" Chalk; Former Mathematics teacher and Kevin's adoptive father (1 episode)
 Daniel Brocklebank as Stuart Cooper; Nikki's ex-husband and Eve's father (1 episode)
 Naveed Choudhry as Tariq Siddiqui; Ex-pupil (1 episode)
 Wendy Craig as Marjorie Windsor; George's mother (1 episode)
 Nicola Jo Cully as Avril Mack; Stevie's mother (1 episode)
 Charles De'Ath as Vincent Wark; Gabriella's father (1 episode)
 Keeley Forsyth as Sammy Hughes; Darren's mother (1 episode)
 Grant Gillen as Stevie Mack; Pupil (1 episode)
 John Kazek as Mr. Kowalski; Shop owner (1 episode)
 Duncan Pow as Jim Ronsley/"Frankie McGregor"; Fraudulent supply teacher (1 episode)
 Clive Russell as Sergeant Major Lawrence Brown; Lenny and Lisa's estranged grandfather (1 episode)
 Jenny Ryan as Sally Stewart; Governor and Imogen's mother (1 episode)
 James Young as Larry Brown; Lenny and Lisa's older brother (1 episode)

Episodes

{| class="wikitable plainrowheaders" width="100%"
|-
! style="background:#45B222; " colspan="9"|Autumn Term
|-
! style="background:#45B222; "| No.
! style="background:#45B222; "| Title
! style="background:#45B222; "| Directed by
! style="background:#45B222; "| Written by
! style="background:#45B222; "| Original air date
! style="background:#45B222; "| UK viewers(million)
|-
 

|-
! style="background:#45B222; " colspan="9"|Spring Term
|-

|}

Footnotes

References

2013 in British television
2014 in British television
2013 British television seasons
2014 British television seasons
Waterloo Road (TV series)